Smoldering Embers is a 1920 American silent drama film directed by Frank Keenan and starring Keenan, Jay Belasco and Katherine Van Buren.

Cast
 Frank Keenan as John Conroy
 Jay Belasco as 	Jack Manners
 Katherine Van Buren as 	Beth Stafford
 Russ Powell as 	Tramp
 Graham Pettie as 	Tramp
 Hardee Kirkland as 	Horace Manners 
 Lucille Ward as Annie Manners
 Frances Raymond as Edith Wyatt
 Tom Guise as Congressman Wyatt 
 Burwell Hamrick as The Boy

References

Bibliography
 Connelly, Robert B. The Silents: Silent Feature Films, 1910-36, Volume 40, Issue 2. December Press, 1998.

External links
 

1920s American films
1920 films
1920 drama films
1920s English-language films
American silent feature films
Silent American drama films
American black-and-white films
Films directed by Frank Keenan
Pathé Exchange films